This article lists the squads for the 2022 Arnold Clark Cup, the inaugural edition of the Arnold Clark Cup. The cup consisted of a series of friendly games, and was held in England from 17 to 23 February 2022. The four national teams involved in the tournament could register a maximum of 25 players.

The age listed for each player is on 17 February 2022, the first day of the tournament. The numbers of caps and goals listed for each player do not include any matches played after the start of tournament. The club listed is the club for which the player last played a competitive match prior to the tournament. The nationality for each club reflects the national association (not the league) to which the club is affiliated. A flag is included for coaches that are of a different nationality than their own national team.

Squads

Canada
Coach:  Bev Priestman

The 25-player squad was announced on 7 February 2022.

England
Coach:  Sarina Wiegman

The 24-player squad was announced on 8 February 2022. On 16 February, Lotte Wubben-Moy withdrew due to an injury and was not replaced.

Germany
Coach: Martina Voss-Tecklenburg

The 25-player squad was announced on 8 February 2022. On 15 February, Svenja Huth, Tabea Waßmuth, Kathrin Hendrich and Sjoeke Nüsken were forced to withdraw from the squad after testing positive for COVID-19. Almuth Schult also withdrew as a close contact. Lena Lattwein withdrew due to a non-covid related illness. They were replaced by Chantal Hagel, Martina Tufekovic, Sarai Linder, Hasret Kayikçi, Ramona Petzelberger, and Leonie Maier.

Spain
Coach: Jorge Vilda

The 23-player squad was announced on 8 February 2022. On 14 February, Sheila García replaced Irene Paredes who withdrew due to a muscle injury. On 15 February, Claudia Zornoza withdrew from the squad after testing positive for COVID-19, and was replaced by Clàudia Pina. On 18 February, Athenea del Castillo replaced Mariona Caldentey who withdrew after picking up a hamstring injury in the first match against Germany.

Player representation

Players
Oldest (goalkeeper):  Erin McLeod
Oldest (outfield):  Jill Scott
Youngest (goalkeeper):  Hannah Hampton
Youngest (outfield):  Jule Brand

By club
Clubs with 3 or more players represented are listed.

By club nationality

By club federation

References

Squads